The Miracle in Motown was the final play of an American football game between the NFC North divisional rivals Green Bay Packers and Detroit Lions on December 3, 2015. The game, which was broadcast on television nationally on Thursday Night Football, was played at Ford Field in Detroit, Michigan during the 2015 NFL season.  On the final play of regulation, with no time remaining on the game clock, Packers quarterback Aaron Rodgers threw a  Hail Mary pass into the end-zone that was caught by tight end Richard Rodgers II for the game-winning touchdown.

The play resulted in a dramatic 27–23 come-from-behind victory for the Packers, who had trailed 20–0 in the second half. The victory was the Packers' fourth-largest comeback in franchise history. It was also the start of a 3–game winning streak that would help the Packers clinch their seventh consecutive postseason berth. The play won the NFL Play of the Year Award for the 2015 season and would be named the year's best play in North American sports at the 2016 ESPY Awards.

Background
The Packers entered the game having lost 4 of their previous 5 games after starting the season 6-0 and were seeking a win to keep pace in a close division race with the Minnesota Vikings. The Lions came into the game following 3 consecutive victories following a 1-7 start to the season and needed a win to keep their slim playoff hopes alive.

Eighteen days prior, the Lions had ended a 24-year winless streak at the Packer's Lambeau Field with an 18–16 victory. With a victory in the teams second meeting, the Lions would achieve their first season sweep of the rival Packers since 1991.

The Lions started the game strong, scoring on their first three possessions while holding the Packers to only 29 yards of offense to take a 17-0 lead. In the second quarter, both offenses struggled to generate offense and Packers entered halftime facing a 17-0 deficit. The Lions would extend their lead with a field goal on the opening drive of the second half to take a 20-0 lead. The Packers would answer scoring 14 points in just under 90 seconds to cut the lead to 20-14. The teams then traded scores, a field goal for Lions and a touchdown for the Packers to bring the score to 23-21 in favor of Detroit as the game reached its final seconds.

Events of the play
With six seconds left on the game clock, Green Bay was faced with a 3rd-and-10 at their own 21-yard line. On a desperation play after one forward pass and one backward pass, Packers tight end Richard Rodgers II lateraled the ball to quarterback Aaron Rodgers, who was quickly tackled at his 24-yard line by Detroit Lions defender Devin Taylor, with the game clock having gone to zero during the play. However, the official standing behind the play called a 15-yard penalty on Taylor for a face mask penalty on the tackle, and so, because NFL rules state that a game cannot end on a defensive penalty, the Packers were given an untimed play at their own 39-yard line.

After the snap, all Packers receivers ran towards the end zone and Aaron Rodgers broke to his left in order to buy time for his receivers to reach the end zone before changing direction and scrambling to his right, escaping the Detroit defenders in the process. Rodgers then threw a  Hail Mary pass into the end zone. Tight end Richard Rodgers II, who was the last player to reach the end zone, leapt high in front of all defenders, caught the ball at full extension, and came down nearly unchallenged for the catch, resulting in the Packers winning 27–23 in walk-off fashion.

According to a number of estimations, Aaron Rodgers's pass traveled  in the air before reaching the hands of Richard Rodgers II. The throw was also high enough to nearly hit the rafters at Ford Field. The Packers 20 point comeback was the fourth-largest in franchise history.

Game box score

Penalty controversy 
The face mask penalty against Detroit that led to the winning play by Green Bay generated controversy, since replays appeared to show Taylor not grabbing Rodgers's facemask.  Dean Blandino, NFL Vice President of Officiating, responded to the call on Twitter moments after the game:

During a visit by NFL officials to a Lions training camp in 2016, Carl Cheffers, the official who threw the flag, was asked about the penalty; he said "I think it was an illegal tackle. Horse-collar, facemask, I think it was an illegal tackle. I’m very comfortable with it."

Naming the play
The nickname for the play, "Miracle in Motown", was first used by Jim Nantz during the nationally broadcast Thursday Night Football postgame show.

Broadcast calls of the final play

TV

Radio

Aftermath

The win snapped a three-game losing streak for the Packers as was credited as saving the teams season. It also helped the Packers maintain pace with the Vikings for the NFC North title, however the Vikings would ultimately win the division, ending the Packers 4 year streak of division titles. The Packers would still make the playoffs as a wild card team. In the playoffs, the Packers would defeat the Washington Redskins 35-18 in the Wild Card Round before falling to the Arizona Cardinals in the Divisional Round 20-26 (the game went into overtime after Rodgers completed another successful Hail Mary pass, this time to Jeff Janis, only for Arizona to win on their opening drive of the extra period largely through the efforts of Larry Fitzgerald). The loss effectively eliminated Detroit from playoff contention and after going 3-1 in their final four games, the Lions would finish the season in 3rd place in NFC North with a 7-9 record.

The play marked the first of three successful Hail Mary's in the span of 13 months for Aaron Rodgers leading him to be regarded as ''The Hail Mary King''. Considered one of the best of the year, the play won the NFL Play of the Year Award for the 2015 season and was named the year's best play in North American sports at the 2016 ESPY Awards.

See also
 2015 Green Bay Packers season
 Lions–Packers rivalry
 List of Hail Mary passes in American football

References

External links

2015 National Football League season
National Football League games
History of the Green Bay Packers
Detroit Lions
American football incidents
December 2015 sports events in the United States
2015 in sports in Michigan